Coming Up Close: A Retrospective is a compilation culled from the works of 'Til Tuesday.  It was released on September 24, 1996 (see 1996 in music).

Track listing

"Love in a Vacuum" (Michael Hausman, Robert Holmes, Aimee Mann, Joey Pesce) – 3:37
"Voices Carry" (Hausman, Holmes, Mann, Pesce) – 4:23
"You Know the Rest" (Hausman, Holmes, Mann, Pesce) – 4:29
"No One Is Watching You Now" (Aimee Mann) – 3:56
"On Sunday" (Hausman, Holmes, Mann, Pesce) – 4:08
"Coming Up Close" (Mann) – 4:42
"Will She Just Fall Down" (Mann) – 2:52
"David Denies" (Hausman, Holmes, Mann, Pesce) – 4:51
"What About Love" (Mann) – 3:58
"Why Must I" (Mann) – 3:38
"The Other End (Of the Telescope)" (Declan MacManus, Mann) – 3:52
"J for Jules" (Mann) – 4:26
"(Believed You Were) Lucky" (Mann, Jules Shear) – 3:38
"Limits to Love" (Mann) – 3:35
"Long Gone Buddy" (Hausman, Mann) – 4:32
"Do It Again" – 6:31

Personnel 
'Til Tuesday
Aimee Mann – Guitar (acoustic), Bass guitar, Vocals
Michael Hausman – Percussion, Drums, Programming
Robert Holmes – Guitar, Background Vocals
Joey Pesce – Synthesizer, Piano, Background Vocals
Michael Montes – Keyboards
Peter Abrams – French horn
Elvis Costello – Background Vocals on track 11
Marcus Miller – Bass on track 15
Haery Ung Shin – Violin

Production 
Bob Clearmountain – Mixing
Rhett Davies – Producer
Bruce Dickinson – Compilation Producer
Hiro Ito – Photography
Bruce Lampcov – Producer
Gail Marowitz – Art Direction and Design
Randee Saint Nicholas – Photography
Mike Thorne – Producer
'Til Tuesday – Producer
Mark Wilder – Digital Mixing

'Til Tuesday albums
Albums produced by Rhett Davies
1996 compilation albums
Epic Records compilation albums
Albums produced by Mike Thorne